Jason Annicchero is a retired American soccer defender who spent six seasons in A-League.

In 1993, Annicchero graduated from Amador Valley High School.  He attended Santa Clara University where he was a 1996 Second Team All American.  On February 1, 1997, the San Jose Clash selected Αnnicchero in the second round (fourteenth overall) of the 1997 MLS College Draft.  Four days later, the Seattle Sounders picked him in the first round of the USISL A-League draft.  Annicchero decided to remain in school to finish his bachelor's degree in business which led to the Clash releasing him.  In June 1997, he signed with the California Jaguars where he played one season.  In February 1998, he Annicchero moved to the Sounders.  He spent two seasons with the Sounders.  On April 8, 2000, Seattle traded him to the San Diego Flash for cash.  In February 2001, he signed with the Atlanta Silverbacks.  He played two seasons in Atlanta then retired.

References

External links
 Seattle Sounders: Jason Annicchero

1975 births
Living people
American soccer players
Atlanta Silverbacks players
California Jaguars players
San Diego Flash players
Seattle Sounders (1994–2008) players
Santa Clara Broncos men's soccer players
Soccer players from California
A-League (1995–2004) players
San Jose Earthquakes draft picks
People from Pleasanton, California
Association football defenders